Róbert Gešnábel (born 24 November 1991) is a professional Slovak footballer who last played for Fortuna Liga club MFK Ružomberok as a forward.

Club career

FC ViOn Zlaté Moravce
Gešnábel made his professional Fortuna Liga debut for FC ViOn Zlaté Moravce on 6 March 2016 against FC Spartak Trnava.

References

External links
 
 FK Slovan Duslo Šaľa official club profile
 Futbalnet profile
 Eurofotbal profile

1991 births
Living people
Slovak footballers
Association football forwards
MFK Topvar Topoľčany players
FK Slovan Duslo Šaľa players
FC ViOn Zlaté Moravce players
MFK Ružomberok players
Slovak Super Liga players
People from Partizánske
Sportspeople from the Trenčín Region